Tonman Mosley, 1st Baron Anslow,  (16 January 1850 – 20 August 1933) was a British businessman, judge and politician.

Family
Tonman Mosley was born at East Lodge, Anslow, Burton upon Trent, Staffordshire, and baptized at Rolleston-on-Dove, Staffordshire, the younger son of Sir Tonman Mosley, 3rd Baronet, of Ancoats, and wife Catherine Wood (died 22 April 1891), daughter of The Reverend John Wood of Swanwick, Derbyshire and Emily Susanna Bellairs (daughter of Abel Walford Bellairs)(see Mosley Baronets for earlier history of the family). His elder brother Sir Oswald Mosley, 4th Baronet, of Ancoats, was the grandfather of Sir Oswald Mosley, 6th Baronet. Mosley's family were Anglo-Irish. His branch were prosperous landowners in Staffordshire.

Career
He was educated at Repton School, Repton, Derbyshire, between 1862 and 1868, and at Corpus Christi College, Oxford, between 1868 and 1871 and graduated from the University of Oxford in 1872 with a Bachelor of Arts degree. He was called to the Bar at Inner Temple in 1874 entitled to practice as a barrister-at-law.

Anslow unsuccessfully contested the Lichfield Division of Staffordshire as a Conservative in the 1885 general election. In 1897 he was appointed Chairman of the Quarter Sessions of Derbyshire, a post he held until 1902, and served as Chairman of the Buckinghamshire County Council from 1904 to 1921. Between 1904 and 1923 he was also Chairman of the North Staffordshire Railway Company. In 1914 Anslow contested the Wycombe Division of Buckinghamshire as a Liberal, but was once again unsuccessful. He also served as a Deputy Lieutenant of Buckinghamshire and Staffordshire.

He was appointed a Companion of the Order of the Bath in 1911 and on 28 June 1916 he was raised to the peerage as 1st Baron Anslow, of Iver, in the County of Buckingham, in the Peerage of the United Kingdom. He was also a Knight of Justice or Grace of the Venerable Order of Saint John.

Marriage and issue
Lord Anslow married on 22 February 1881 at St Peter's Church, Eaton Square, Belgravia, London, Lady Hilda Rose Montgomerie, daughter of Archibald William Montgomerie, 13th Earl of Eglinton and Lady Adela Caroline Harriett Capel. They had two sons and two daughters.-- both his sons, Captain Nicholas Mosley (28 July 1882, baptized Rolleston on Dove, Staffordshire – Hospital, Vincent Square, Westminster, London, 1 August 1915 from wounds caused by a sniper's bullet on the Western Front in World War I, who fought in the Second Boer War between 1900 and 1902 and in World War I between 1914 and 1915, and was an Officer in 1901 in the service of the North Staffordshire Regiment and a Captain on 20 March 1914, Adjutant of the 5th Battalion of the Sherwood Foresters in 1915) and Edward Hugh Mosley (16 July 1884 – 16 July 1910), unmarried and without issue, predeceased him. His daughter Mildred Mosley (9 June 1887 – 1 January 1963) married on 20 November 1918 Gerald Goddard Jackson (born 1878), and their marriage was annulled. His daughter Sybil Hildegarde Mosley (14 January 1896 – 7 July 1962) married on 14 November 1934 Alastair Turner Wyllie.

Lady Anslow died at Bangors, Iver, Buckinghamshire, on 18 June 1928. Lord Anslow survived her by five years and died in August 1933, aged 83, without surviving male issue, when the barony became extinct. His burial was a cremation at Woking, Surrey, on 24 August 1933.

Arms

References

www.buckscc.gov.uk

1850 births
1933 deaths
Barons in the Peerage of the United Kingdom
Companions of the Order of the Bath
Deputy Lieutenants of Buckinghamshire
Deputy Lieutenants of Staffordshire
Members of Buckinghamshire County Council
Members of the Inner Temple
Mosley, Tonman
Conservative Party (UK) parliamentary candidates
Liberal Party (UK) parliamentary candidates
Alumni of Corpus Christi College, Oxford
People educated at Repton School
Tonman
Barons created by George V